The Bank of Montreal (BMO) is a Canadian multinational investment bank and financial services company.

The bank was founded in Montreal, Quebec, in 1817 as Montreal Bank; while its head office remains in Montreal, the operational headquarters and executive offices have been located in Toronto, Ontario since 1977. One of the Big Five banks in Canada, it is the third-largest bank in Canada by market capitalization and assets, and one of the eight largest banks in North America and the top 50 in the world. It is commonly known by its ticker symbol BMO (pronounced ), on both the Toronto Stock Exchange and the New York Stock Exchange. In October 2021, it had CA$634 billion in assets under administration (AUA). The Bank of Montreal swift code is BOFMCAM2 and the institution number is 001.

On 23 June 1817, John Richardson and eight merchants signed the Articles of Association to establish the Montreal Bank in a rented house in Montreal, Quebec. The bank officially began conducting business on 3 November 1817, making it Canada's oldest bank. It underwent a name change to its current in 1822. BMO's Institution Number (or bank number) is 001.  In Canada, the bank operates as BMO Bank of Montreal and has more than 800 branches, serving over seven million customers. In the United States, it does business as BMO Financial Group, where it has substantial operations in the Chicago area and elsewhere in the country, where it operates BMO Harris Bank. BMO Capital Markets is BMO's investment and corporate banking division, while the wealth management division is branded as BMO Nesbitt Burns. The company is ranked at number 131 on the Forbes Global 2000 list.

The company has not missed a dividend payment since 1829, paying dividends consistently through major world crises such as World War I, the Great Depression, World War II, and the 2008 financial crisis; this makes the Bank of Montreal's dividend payment history one of the longest in the world.

On December 12, 2021 Bank of Montreal announced the strategic acquisition of Bank of the West from BNP Paribas for US$16.3 billion.

History

19th century
The bank was established on 23 June 1817, when a group of merchants signed the Articles of Association, formally creating the "Montreal Bank". The signors of the document include Robert Armour, John C. Bush, Austin Cuvillier, George Garden, Horatio Gates, James Leslie, George Moffatt, John Richardson, and Thomas A. Turner. The bank was first located in rooms rented on Rue Saint-Paul, Montreal, before moving to its permanent building on Rue Saint-Paul in 1818. In the same year, the bank opened its first branch in Quebec City; and several offices in Upper Canada, including Amherstburg, Kingston, Perth, and York (present day Toronto). The bank also opened its first foreign permanent office in 1818, opening an office in Willam Street in New York City.

By 1822, the bank converted from the status it had held since its founding as a private company owned by a small group of people into a public company owned by 144. At this time, it became officially known by its current name.

Expansion into Upper Canada was halted in 1824, after legislation from the Parliament of Upper Canada forbade bank branches whose head offices were not based in Upper Canada from operating. In 1838, the bank reentered the Upper Canadian market with the purchase of the Bank of the People, a bank based in Toronto. BMO was permitted to open its own branches in the area, after Upper Canada and Lower Canada were united to create the Province of Canada in 1841.  Shortly after the two colonies merged, the bank opened branches into Cobourg, Belleville, Brockville, and Ottawa.

Expansion into the Maritimes and Western Canada was facilitated following Canadian Confederation. In 1877, the bank opened its first branch into Western Canada, with the opening of a branch in Winnipeg. New branches were also opened in the Maritimes, in Halifax, Moncton, and Saint John completed shortly after Confederation. The Bank of Montreal established branches in Newfoundland Colony on 31 January 1895, at the behest of the colonial government. The colonial government of Newfoundland made the request to the Bank of Montreal four days after the collapse of the Commercial Bank and Union Bank of Newfoundland on 10 December 1894.

20th century
By 1907, the bank had branches in every province of Atlantic Canada, with the opening of a branch in Charlottetown. Expansion into the Maritimes was further facilitated with the acquisition of the Exchange Bank of Yarmouth in 1903, the People’s Bank of Halifax in 1905, and the People's Bank of New Brunswick in 1906.

The early 20th century also saw the bank acquire several financial institutions that helped increase its presence in Newfoundland, and areas west of Quebec, including the Ontario Bank in 1906, the Bank of British North America in 1918, and the Merchants Bank of Canada in 1921. During this period, the bank also acquired the Montreal-based Molson Bank in 1925.

In 1942, the bank ended production of its own bank notes, which were in circulation in Canada since 1871. By 1944, the central bank of the country, the Bank of Canada became the sole issuer of currency in Canada, and notes from private banks were withdrawn.

In 1960, the Bank of Montreal moved its operational headquarters to a seventeen-storey structure next to its historic head office. The building served as the bank's operational headquarters until 1977, when it was moved to First Canadian Place on Bay Street in Toronto in 1977. The structure's was named after the slogan of the bank, the First Canadian Bank, a slogan that was introduced in 1969. The bank's present "M-Bar" logo was also introduced during this time, in 1967. However, the bank's legal headquarters remains at the historic Montreal head office, with First Canadian Place formally listed as the "executive office" of the bank.

In 1984, the bank acquired Chicago-based Harris Bank (through its parent, Harris Bankcorp), later rebranded as BMO Harris Bank. In 1987, the bank acquired stock brokerage Nesbitt, Thomson and Company. Several years later, the bank assumed control of two retail branches formerly belonging to the Standard Chartered Bank of Canada.

In 1994, the Bank of Montreal became the first Canadian bank to be listed on the New York Stock Exchange. In 1995, the bank opened its first branch in Guangzhou, formally receiving a license to operate the branch on 20 November 1996. In doing so the bank became the first Canadian bank to receive a license to operate in China. During the 1990s, BMO acquired a number of other banks in the Chicago area, merging them under the Harris Bank name, including Suburban Bancorp in 1994; and Household Bank in 1999.

In 1998, the Bank of Montreal and the Royal Bank of Canada announced they had agreed to a merger pending approval from the government. Government regulators later blocked the proposed merger, along with a similar proposal by the Toronto-Dominion Bank to merge with the Canadian Imperial Bank of Commerce. Although the banks did not merge, in 2000, the Bank of Montreal, together with the Royal Bank of Canada, merged their merchant payment processor businesses to form Moneris Solutions.

21st century
In 2006, BMO bought BCPBank, a Schedule C financial institution that was the Canadian division of Banco Comercial Português, with eight branches in the Toronto-West area. In 2008, a Bank of Montreal trader pleaded guilty to intentionally mismarking his trading book in order to increase his bonus from the bank.

In 2009, BMO purchased AIG's Canadian life insurance business, AIG Life Insurance Company of Canada, for approximately CA$330 million. The transaction, including 400,000 customers and 300 employees, made BMO the second-biggest life insurer among Canadian banks. The new component was renamed BMO Life Assurance Company. In the same year, the Bank of Montreal acquired the Diners Club International's North American franchise from Citibank. The transaction gave BMO exclusive rights to issue Diners cards in the US and Canada.

In October 2010, the bank became the first Canadian bank to incorporate in China, with branches in China operating as BMO ChinaCo. In December 2010, BMO announced the purchase of Milwaukee-based Marshall & Ilsley, and was later amalgamated with its Harris Bank operations. When the transaction completed, M&I Bank, along with current Harris Bank branches were rebranded BMO Harris Bank. In 2014, the bank acquired London-based Foreign & Colonial Investment Trust, later re-branding it as BMO Commercial Property Trust in 2019. In September 2015, BMO agreed to acquire General Electric Co. subsidiary GE Capital's transportation-finance unit. The business acquired has US$8.7 billion (CA$11.5 billion) of assets, 600 employees and 15 offices in the US and Canada. Exact terms were not disclosed but the final price would be based on the value of the assets at closing plus a premium according to the parties.

BMO and Simplii Financial (a subsidiary of the Canadian Imperial Bank of Commerce) were the targets of hackers in May 2018, who claimed to have compromised the systems of both banks and stolen information on a combined 90,000 customers (50,000 from BMO). An email sent from a Russian address and attributed to the hackers demanded a ransom of 1 million from each company paid via Ripple by 11:59 pm on 28 May 2018 or the information would be released on "fraud forum and fraud community".

In 2018, BMO went into the marijuana sector with a $175 million deal for a stake in a producer. It was the first investment in the sector by a "Big Five Canadian bank". In January 2018, the bank was accused in a lawsuit along with five other Canadian banks for "conspiring to rig a Canadian rate benchmark to improve profits from derivatives trading". Setting a similar goal to competitors, in October 2018, the company had stated it wanted to attract 1 million new customers to its personal banking division over the following five years. BMO was the bank with the second-most deposits in Chicago by June 2018, with 11.5% market share. Also that month, its BMO Harris division was operating in eight states in the US. The Bank of Montreal had Can$743.6 billion of assets, and ranked among the top 10 North American banks in that status. In September 2018, the bank's CEO stated to the press the bank would have around $1 billion in earnings from their US operations that year.

After resigning from the Canadian Liberal cabinet, Scott Brison was hired by the bank as its vice-chair of investment and corporate banking in February 2019. In February 2019, it became reported that its US retail profits had surged. The bank moved its New York City headquarters in April 2019, to a former Conde Nast building. That month, the bank's Irish subsidiary was fined several million for a license breach. To settle charges by the SEC that it hid conflicts of interest from clients in 2016, in September 2019 the Bank of Montreal's two units in Chicago paid $38 million. In December 2019, the bank cut 2,300 jobs, after a drop in quarterly earnings, effecting around five percent of the workforce.

The company had plans to "double indigenous lending" in September 2019. There was controversy and protests in January 2020 after a Vancouver branch of the bank handcuffed a 12-year-old First Nations girl and her grandfather for an identification discrepancy. The Vancouver mayor criticized the bank for what he termed giving false information to the police. The police were afterwards investigated.

In January 2020, BMO launched an Indigenous Advisory Council with Indigenous members from a number of provinces.

The CEO of the bank argued against fossil fuel divestment in March 2020, after it "acquired $3 billion of energy loans from Deutsche Bank DBKGn.DE in 2018". In April 2020, the company stated it would temporarily cut credit card interest rates to ease the impact of the COVID-19 pandemic on clients. The company described accelerating its automation in August 2020.

In 2021, BMO affirmed the need to reach global net-zero climate targets as well as net-zero financed emissions in their lending by 2050. A climate institute committed to understanding and managing the financial risks and opportunities related to a low-carbon transition was created and the bank signed the UN Principles for Responsible Banking (PRB).

In December 2021, BMO agreed to acquire Bank of the West from BNP Paribas, with the intent of merging it with BMO Harris Bank, which would at least double BMO's total presence in the United States. BMO's acquisition of Bank of the West was completed in February 2023, and the Bank of the West brand is planned to be absorbed into the BMO brand by September 2023.

In July 2022, BMO announced it would buy Calgary-based Radicle Group Inc., a prominent adviser to companies on sustainability and measuring carbon emissions, as the bank tries to meet surging demand from its clients for advice about how to navigate a global energy transition.

Corporate information

Operations
BMO is divided into three "client groups" which serve different markets. Each of the client groups operates under multiple brand names.

 Personal and Commercial Client Group (retail banking), including
 BMO Bank of Montreal (commercial and retail banking in Canada), including BMO's MasterCard credit cards; BMO Life, a life insurance company; and the former virtual bank division mbanx
 BMO USA (commercial and retail banking in the United States, headquartered in Chicago)
 Investment Banking Group (known as BMO Capital Markets)
 Private Client Group (wealth management), including
  (full service investing in Canada): formed following 1987 acquisition of Nesbitt Thomson, then one of Canada's oldest investment houses, and the  1994 acquisition of Burns Fry, a dealer of Canadian equities and debt securities. Nesbitt Thomson and Burns Fry then merged to become BMO Nesbitt Burns.
 BMO InvestorLine (self-service investing in Canada)
 BMO Harris Investor Services (advisory services in the United States)
 BMO Private Banking (private banking in Canada and the United States) including Harris myCFO and Cedar Street Advisors (both affiliates of BMO Harris Bank) In 2014–2015 BMO rebranded BMO Harris Private Bank as BMO Private Bank.
In October 2008, Mediacorp Canada Inc. named BMO Financial Group one of Greater Toronto's Top Employers. Notable Employees of the Month include Penche Scurtis.

Governance
Current members of the board of directors of BMO are: Jan Babiak, Sophie Brochu, Craig Broderick, George Cope, Christine A. Edwards, Martin S. Eichenbaum, Ronald H. Farmer, David Harquail, Linda S. Huber, Eric R. La Flèche, Lorraine Mitchelmore and Darryl White.

Presidents
President was the highest-ranking position at the bank from its founding until the middle of the twentieth century, however this was superseded by chief executive officer in 1959, beginning with G. Arnold Hart. Several of his successors as President were CEO as well, however Matthew W. Barrett was the first top executive not to be styled president.

 John Gray (1817 to 1820); co-founder and first president
 Samuel Gerrard (1820 to 1826)
 Horatio Gates (1826); co-founder and president
 John Molson (1826 to 1834)
 Peter McGill (1834 to 1860)
 Thomas Brown Anderson (1860 to 1869)
 Edwin Henry King (1869 to 1873)
 David Torrance (1873 to 1876)
 George Stephen (1876 to 1881)
 C. F. Smithers (1881 to 1887)
 Donald Smith (1887 to 1905)
 George Alexander Drummond (1905 to 1910)
 Richard B. Angus (1910 to 1913)
 Sir Vincent Meredith (1913 to 1927)
 Sir Charles Blair Gordon (1927 to 1939)
 Huntly Redpath Drummond (1939 to 1942)
 George Wilbur Spinney (1942 to 1948)
 Bertie Charles Gardner (1948 to 1952)
 Gordon Ball (1952 to 1959)
 G. Arnold Hart (president from 1959 to 1967 and CEO from 1959 to 1974)
 Fred McNeil (CEO from 1975 to 1979)
 William D. Mulholland (CEO from 1979 to 1989)
 William E. Bradford (president 1981-1983)
 Matthew W. Barrett (president from 1987 to 1990 and CEO from 1990–1999)
 F. Anthony Comper (CEO from 1999 to 2007)
 Bill Downe (from 1 March 2007 to 31 October 2017)

Chief Executive Officers

Since the middle of the twentieth century, the senior officer of Bank of Montreal has been styled President and chief executive officer beginning with G. Arnold Hart. That officer often also held the title chairman of the board, until 2003 when a non-executive chairman was appointed.

The title of the second-ranking executive has changed several times and has often been left vacant. As deputy to Matthew Barrett, F. Anthony Comper was President and chief operating officer from 1990 to 1999, after which he became chairman and CEO while retaining the title of President. During most of Anthony Comper's tenure as CEO, while there was no official "number two" executive, the CEO of BMO Capital Markets (the investment banking division) was largely considered the second-most powerful officer. Bill Downe ascended from CEO of BMO Capital to chief operating officer of the BMO group, but held the title only for one-year until he succeeded Comper as President and CEO in 2007. Darryl White succeeded Downe in 2017.

 Matthew W. Barrett (1990 to 1999)
 F. Anthony Comper (1999 to 2007)
 Bill Downe (March 1, 2007 to October 31, 2017)
 Darryl White (from November 1, 2017)

Credit ratings
Rating agency Moody's Investors Service began to review the long-term ratings of the Bank of Montreal and other Canadian banks because of concerns about consumer debt levels, housing prices, and a sizable exposure to capital markets in October 2012. In January 2013, the service announced downgrades for Bank of Montreal and five others.

Notable buildings

Historic branches
A number of buildings in which Bank of Montreal presently operates branches have been designated by municipal, provincial, and/or federal levels of government as being of historic importance. These include:

 The Bank of Montreal, 4896 Delta Street, Delta, British Columbia (1919)
 The Bank of Montreal, 511 Columbia Street, New Westminster, British Columbia (1947–1948)
 The Bank of Montreal, 322 Curling Street, Corner Brook, Newfoundland and Labrador (1915)
 The Bank of Montreal, 426 Portage Avenue, Winnipeg, Manitoba (1927)
 The "Old Bank of Montreal", 100 Victoria Street East, Amherst, Nova Scotia (1906)
 The Bank of Montreal, 1 Main Street West, Hamilton, Ontario (1928)
 The Bank of Montreal, 144 Wellington Street, Ottawa, Ontario built by Ernest Barott of Barott and Blackader, architects, of Montreal
 The Bank of Montreal, 3 King Street, Waterloo, Ontario, formerly known as the Molson's Bank, by architect Andrew Taylor (1914)

A number of late-19th century Bank of Montreal branches were also built by British architect, Andrew Taylor. Taylor designed a three-storey structure for the Bank of Montreal on Saint Jacques Street in Montreal. The building was modelled after a Georgian townhouse with a small portico of Corinthian columns supporting a classical pediment and remains the bank's legal headquarters.

 The Bank of Montreal in West End, Ste. Catherine Street West at Mansfield Street, Montreal (1889)
 The Bank of Montreal in Notre Dame Street West Seigneurs Street, Montreal (1894)
 The Bank of Montreal in Point St. Charles Branch, Wellington Street at Magdalen Street, Montreal (1901)
 The Bank of Montreal, St. Catherine Street West at Papineau Street, Montreal (1904)
 The Bank of Montreal, Perth, Ontario (1884)
 The Bank of Montreal, Calgary, Alberta, Stephen Avenue at Scarth Street [now 1 Street SW] (1888)
 Manager's residence for the Bank of Montreal, Grande Allée, Quebec City, Quebec (1904)
 The Bank of Montreal in Sydney, Nova Scotia; designated by The Cape Breton Regional Municipality as a registered heritage property in 2008, (1901)

Buildings that formerly housed a branch of the bank have also seen later notable use. A branch in Montreal has been designated as a National Historic Site of Canada in 1990. The building was completed in 1894, and was designated as a historic site as a good example of Queen Anne Revival architecture. Another former Bank of Montreal branch on Front and Yonge Streets in Toronto has housed the Hockey Hall of Fame since 1993. The 1885 Beaux-Arts styled building designed by the Toronto firm of Darling & Curry.

Headquarters
Completed in 1847, the Bank of Montreal Head Office is formally located in Montreal, on Saint Jacques Street. However in 1960, the operational headquarters was moved to a 17-storey tower adjacent the historic head office building. In 1977, the bank's operational headquarters or "executive office", was moved to First Canadian Place in Toronto, with the chairman, president, and some senior executives working from First Canadian Place. The structure's was named after a historic slogan of the bank, the First Canadian Bank, a slogan introduced in 1969.

Sponsorships
The Bank of Montreal has been a sponsor for different events and institutions. The bank is a founder and major sponsor of the Siminovitch Prize in Theatre, an annual award of $100,000 granted to a Canadian director, playwright, or designer.

The bank is a sponsor of sports teams. The bank has been a sponsor of the Toronto FC of Major League Soccer since 2007 and of its home stadium named BMO Field at Exhibition Place. In 2010, BMO extended its agreement with the Toronto FC through the 2016 season. The bank is also a sponsor of the CF Montréal, announcing a five-year agreement to become lead sponsor and jersey sponsor on 14 June 2011. In addition, the bank is a sponsor of Los Angeles FC, with their stadium being named BMO Stadium since 2023.

From at least 2007 through 2011, BMO was formerly the sponsor for the Toronto Maple Leafs and the Toronto Raptors. In July 2008, BMO announced a one-year sponsorship of IndyCar team Newman/Haas/Lanigan Racing to appear on the No. 06 car of Graham Rahal in the first-ever IRL-sanctioned Canadian IndyCar race at Edmonton. The Bank of Montreal is also a sponsor for a number of sports events and programs. Since 1997, Bank of Montreal has been a major sponsor of Skate Canada, and is the title sponsor of the BMO Financial Group Canadian Championships, BMO Financial Group Skate Canada Junior Nationals, BMO Financial Group Skate Canada Challenges, BMO Financial Group Skate Canada Sectionals, and BMO Financial Group Skate Canada Synchronized Championships. It is also the presenting sponsor of the CanSkate Learn-to-Skate Program. In 2005, BMO Bank of Montreal became the title sponsor for the annual May marathon race staged by the Vancouver International Marathon Society. The current name is "BMO Bank of Montreal Vancouver Marathon".

Membership
BMO is a member of the Canadian Bankers Association and registered member with the Canada Deposit Insurance Corporation, a federal agency insuring deposits at all of Canada's chartered banks. It is also a member of:

 Air Miles
 ATM Industry Association
 Interac
 Cirrus for MasterCard card users
 Diners Club North America
 MasterCard International

BMO Harris Bank (BMO's US operations) is a member of the Federal Reserve System and a registered member of the Federal Deposit Insurance Corporation. It is also a member of:

 Cirrus for MasterCard card users
 Diners Club North America
 Interlink for Visa card users
 NYCE for MasterCard card users
 MasterCard International
 Plus for Visa card users
 Visa

See also
 BMO SmartFolio
 List of banks and credit unions in Canada
 List of banks in the Americas
 List of largest banks

References

Further reading
 Denison, Merrill, 1893–1975. Canada's first bank: a history of the Bank of Montreal. Toronto: McClelland and Stewart, c1966. 2 v. : ill., maps, ports., (some folded, some col).; 25 cm.
 Nolin-Raynauld, Michelle, 1926–. The Bank of Montreal building on Place d'Armes, 1845–1901. Toreword by Jean Bélisle; translated by Judith Berman. Montreal: Varia Press, c1999. 143 p. : facsm., ill., plans; 23 cm. Originally presented as the author's thesis (master—Université de Montréal), 1984, under the title: L'architecture de la Banque de Montréal à la Place d'Armes. Translation of: L'édifice de la Banque de Montréal à la Place d'Armes, 1845–1901. 
 BMO Financial Group Corporate Archives, Montreal
 Rupert Canadian Investment Bank Review McGraw-Hill Ryerson, Limited 1992

External links

 

 BMO Nesbitt Burns

 
1817 establishments in Lower Canada
Banks established in 1817
Banks of Canada
Canadian brands
Companies listed on the New York Stock Exchange
Companies listed on the Toronto Stock Exchange
Exchange-traded funds
Mortgage lenders of Canada
Multinational companies headquartered in Canada
S&P/TSX 60
Canadian companies established in 1817